Salomon Aben Yaesh (Hebrew: שלמה יאיש, Turkish: Süleyman Yaeş) was born Alvaro Mendes in 1520 in Tavira, Portugal, into a Marrano family. Yaesh, alongside Solomon Eskenazi, is regarded as one of the most influential figures in Ottoman foreign affairs history. He died in 1603, aged 83.

Life and career 
In 1545, when he traveled to India, Yaesh made a fortune thanks to diamond mining. He returned to Portugal in 1555, and was knighted by Joao III. Yaesh, who had a grudge against Spain due to the Alhambra Decree, had close contacts with the statesmen of Northern Europe. After the death of the King of Portugal in 1580, Yaesh backed Antonio I's claim to the throne over King of Spain Philip II's.

Alvaro Mendes settled in Thessaloniki in the Ottoman Empire to practice his religion freely, in 1585, proclaiming his Judaism and taking the name Salomon Aben Yaeş. Having gained the trust of Murad III, Yaesh was given the title of Duke of Lesbos and appointed as the Palace Commissioner; he filled the office vacated by Joseph Nasi for 20 years. Yaesh, whose biggest aim was to reach a Turkish-British agreement against Spain, learned what was going on in European capitals thanks to its agents in Europe, and conveyed it to the Ottoman Palace. The British Ambassador in Istanbul, Edward Barton, saw Yaesh's direct correspondence with the Queen of England, Elizabeth I, as a threat to his office, and began to look for an opportunity to discredit Yaesh. Meanwhile, Antonio I, who demanded a large amount of money from Yaesh, was refused, and accused Yaesh of committing illegal acts. Barton supported this accusation. The Queen of England, who was aware of the situation, sent a letter to the Ottoman Sultan and acquitted Yaesh in English courts.

Yaesh ensured Britain's neutrality in a possible Ottoman-Austrian war in 1593. When Yaesh established friendly relations between the Ottomans and the British, it prevented the development of Spain, one of the powerful states of the region. He continued his duty as Duke of Lesbos during the reign of Mehmed III, who came to the throne after Murad III's death. He died in 1603. He had two sons, Jacob and Benjamin, and a daughter, Hanna.

References 

1520 births
1603 deaths
Portuguese Jews
Sephardi Jews from the Ottoman Empire
People from Tavira